Franklin Leander Gilson (October 22, 1846June 7, 1892) was an American politician and jurist.  He was the 32nd Speaker of the Wisconsin State Assembly, and for the last two years of his life, he was judge of the Milwaukee Superior Court.  Earlier in his career, he served as district attorney for Pierce County for six years.

Biography

Born in Middlefield, Ohio, Gilson studied at Hiram College and Oberlin College, but did not graduate. In 1870, he moved to West Bend, Wisconsin, in Washington County, and studied law with his uncle Leander F. Frisby. In 1872, Gilson was admitted to the State Bar of Wisconsin and practiced law in Ellsworth, Wisconsin, in far west Pierce County.

Gilson served as district attorney of Pierce County, Wisconsin, from 1875 to 1881. A member of the Republican Party, Gilson was a delegate for Wisconsin to the 1880 Republican National Convention.  That same year, he was elected to represent Pierce County in the Wisconsin Assembly.  He was re-elected in 1881, and in the 1882 session, he was chosen by his caucus as Speaker of the Assembly.

In 1883, Gilson moved to Milwaukee, Wisconsin, to practice law with his uncle Leander Frisby. In 1890, Gilson was appointed judge of Milwaukee Superior Court serving until his death in 1892.

Notes

External links

1846 births
1892 deaths
People from Geauga County, Ohio
People from Ellsworth, Wisconsin
Politicians from Milwaukee
Hiram College alumni
Oberlin College alumni
Wisconsin state court judges
District attorneys in Wisconsin
People from West Bend, Wisconsin
19th-century American politicians
19th-century American judges
Republican Party members of the Wisconsin State Assembly